Sângeorgiu de Pădure (English (lit.): Saint George on the Heath,) is a town in Mureș County, Transylvania, Romania.

Bezid (Bözöd), Bezidu Nou (Bözödújfalu), and Loțu (Lóc) villages are administratively part of the town.

History 

The first written record of the town is preserved in a papal tithe applotment list from 1333 in which mention is made  of a priest, "de Sancto Georgio," who paid a sum of 6 dinars to the neighboring diocese. In 1347, a man named Erdő, count of the Székelys, and the sons of Erdő of Erdőszentgyörgy were mentioned. In 1442, Anna Herepei, wife of Erdő of Erdewzenthgergh is written about. The village was the estate of Francis I Rákóczi, prince of Transylvania. The Rédey castle was built in 1647. In 1788, Péter Bodor was born here. In 1818–1809, the Rédey castle was rebuilt. In 1913, the official Hungarian name of the village was Erdőszentgyörgy.

Its Romanian name was originally Erdeo-Sângeorgiu; in 1919 the name changed to Sîngeorgiul de Pădure, which later was changed by Romanian authorities to the current official name.

In the mid-1780s, as part of the Josephine administrative reform, Marosszék was integrated into Küküllő county, however, the szék-system was restored in 1790. After the suppression of the Hungarian Revolution in 1849, the village formed part of the Kibéd military sub-division of the Marosvásárhely division in the Udvarhely military district. Between 1861 and 1876, the former Marosszék was restored. As a result of the administrative reform in 1876, the village fell within Nyárádszereda district of Maros-Torda County in the Kingdom of Hungary.

After the Hungarian–Romanian War of 1918–19 and the Treaty of Trianon of 1920, Sângeorgiu de Pădure became part of Romania and fell within the Mureș County during the interwar period. In 1940, the Second Vienna Award granted Northern Transylvania to Hungary and it was held by Hungary until 1944. Administered by the Soviet authorities after 12 November 1944, the village, together with the rest of Northern Transylvania, came under Romanian administration on 13 March 1945 and became officially part of Romania in 1947. Between 1952 and 1960, the commune fell within the Magyar Autonomous Region, between 1960 and 1968 the Mureș-Magyar Autonomous Region. In 1968, the province was abolished, and since then, the settlement has been part of Mureș County. It became a town in 2004.
 
The grave of Claudia Rhédey, grandmother of Mary of Teck, is placed in the crypt of the Reformed church, which was renovated in 1936 from a donation on behalf of Queen Mary of Teck (great-granddaughter of count Rhédey and grandmother of Queen Elisabeth II) and the British royal family.

Demographics 
Sângeorgiu de Pădure has an absolute Székely Hungarian majority. In 1900, the village had, in order of population size,  Hungarian (91,23%) and 352 Romanian (7.77%) inhabitants. In 1930, the census indicated  Hungarians (61.17%),  Romanians (24.73%), 334 Jews (6.92%) and 334 Gypsies (6.92%). According to the 2011 census,  (75,48%) residents reported themselves as Hungarian, while  were Romanian (17.88%) and 4.74% Gypsy, from a total of   inhabitants. In 2002,  households were registered in the town along with  residential buildings.

The 2002 Census reported Calvinism being professed by 54.71% of the total population, while 19.61% of the respondents belonged to the Romanian Orthodox Church, 10.34% of the respondents identified themselves as Unitarian, 8.55% as Roman Catholic, and 1.07% as Baptist.

Politics

The local Town Council has 15 members:

Landmarks 

The Rhédey Castle was built in 1759 on the site of a former 16th-century castle. The castle was rebuilt in 1808. This is where Countess Claudine Rhédey von Kis-Rhéde grew up.
The reformed church was built in the late 13th and early 14th centuries. The synode of the Unitarian church was held here in 1621 whern the Unitarians officially distanced themselves from the Sabbatarians as 'Judaizers'. It has belonged to the Reformed church since 1640. The church tower was added during the era of the Reformation. The patrons of the church were the Rhédey and Wesselényi families. It was rebuilt and restored in 1760. During a plague, the crypt below the church was closed by a wall by order of Gabriel Bethlen, prince of Transylvania. The crypt of the Rhédey family is also in this church. The Rhédey Mausoleum, now in ruins, stands on top of a hill north of the village. This is where the remains of countess Claudia Rhédey, wife of Duke Alexander of Württemberg were removed in 1841 and moved into the Reformed church.
The Orthodox church was built in 1838 in the place of a former wooden church.
The town has a synagogue, too.
The mansion house of the Zeyk family is from the 16th century. Lieutenant General János Kiss was born in this house.

Notable people 
 Péter Bodor, Székely mechanic, was born here in 1788
 Countess Claudine Rhédey von Kis-Rhéde, morganatic wife of Duke Alexander of Württemberg. She is the great-great grandmother of Queen Elizabeth II of the United Kingdom
 Lieutenant General János Kiss, martyr of Hungarian anti-German resistance movement, was born here in 1883.
  (born 1959), mathematician

Twinnings 
The town is twinned with:
  Baja, Hungary (since 2002)
  Bélapátfalva, Hungary (since 2006)
  Celldömölk, Hungary (since 2001)
  Inke, Hungary (since 2011)
  Kovačica, Serbia (since 2007)
  Plan-les-Ouates, Switzerland (since 2002)
  Varades, France (since 2000)

See also 
 List of Hungarian exonyms (Mureș County)

References

External links 

Populated places in Mureș County
Localities in Transylvania
Towns in Romania
Székely communities